CEITEC (the Central European Institute of Technology) is an educational institution in Brno, Czech Republic. It is a Research Center for Life Sciences, Advanced Materials and Nanotechnology. CEITEC was founded by a group of Brno universities (Masaryk University, Brno University of Technology, Mendel University, University of Veterinary and Pharmaceutical Sciences Brno) and research institutes (Institute of Physics of the Academy of Sciences of the Czech Republic and Research Institute of Veterinary Medicine) and supported by both the South Moravian Region and the city of Brno. Within CEITEC, a number of laboratories were built with instrumentation and facilities. CEITEC is member of EU-LIFE, an alliance of leading life sciences research centres in Europe.

Research Areas 
CEITEC was the first scientific center in the Czech Republic to integrate research and development in the field of life sciences, advanced materials and technologies to such an extent. At the heart of the project is the synergy of 7 research areas which allows to study objects of living and inanimate nature at all available levels of complexity.

The knowledge and experience of scientists from the six research institutes involved is divided into 59 research groups according to their expertise. Of the total, 36 are under Masaryk University, 14 under the Brno University of Technology, 4 under the Veterinary and Pharmaceutical University, 2 under the Institute of Physics of ASCR, 2 under the Institute of Veterinary Medicine and 1 under the Mendel University.

CEITEC Masaryk University 
The Central European Institute of Technology – Masaryk University (CEITEC MU) is an independent university institute, which was established at Masaryk University as part of the CEITEC - CEO Center of Excellence. CEITEC MU is a part of the research infrastructure that was built in 2014 at the University Campus in Brno–Bohunice and provides equipment and conditions for basic and applied research, especially in the field of life sciences.

CEITEC Brno University of Technology 
CEITEC Brno University of Technology is part of CEITEC's "scientific centre of excellence". Since 2016, it forms a key component of research infrastructure with facilities and conditions for both basic and applied research in advanced nanotechnology and micro-technology and advanced materials. There are two research areas at CEITEC BUT where a total of 12 research groups dealing with ceramic materials, cybernetics for material science, advanced polymer materials or smart nanodevices, experimental bio-photonics, preparation and characterization of nanostructures, development of methods of analysis and measurement, as well as characterization of materials and advanced coatings. Both research programs offer the possibility of PhD study.

In 2018, two ERC grants are launched at CEITEC BUT, one of which focuses on more efficient treatment of cancer, and the other deals with the development of new technologies of spectroscopy and microscopy. An important achievement is also the acquisition of FET Open projects and the solution of two Teaming in the first phase.

Core Facility 
CEITEC offers access to 12 shared laboratories equipped with instrumentation in the field of life sciences, nanotechnology and advanced materials. Advanced instrumentation, funded by national and European projects, is available to both internal and external academic and corporate users from both the Czech Republic and abroad. Most of CEITEC's shared laboratories are part of the Czech Republic's Big Infrastructures for Research, Experimental Development and Innovation for the years 2016 to 2022. Various opportunities for open access and its financing, services and expertise.

CEITEC Nano 
Research Infrastructure CEITEC Nano at the CEITEC BUT campus under Palackého vrch provides facilities, backgrounds and methods for research and development of nanotechnologies and advanced materials. The research infrastructure is concentrated in shared laboratories - Nanostructure Preparation Laboratories (cleanliness class 100, area 356 m2), Nanostructure Characterization Laboratories (class 100 000, area 1 337 m2) and Structural Analysis Laboratories (class 100 000, area 300 m2). These laboratories in a dust-free, high-purity environment offer complete processes for the preparation and characterization of nano-objects, up to sub-nanometer levels. The research infrastructure has been in operation since 2016 and is one of the largest clean laboratory facilities in the Czech Republic.

Selected grants 
Currently, CEITEC has four holders of the ERC grant. It also focuses on the acquisition of international institutional projects (especially H2020), which help to increase the competitiveness of both scientists and the institute itself.

Financing 
The source of funding for the Center of Scientific Excellence CEITEC is the European Regional Development Fund, which is drawn from the Operational Program Research and Development for Innovation, Priority Axis 1 - European Centers of Excellence. The total budget of the CEITEC project amounts to 5.24 billion CZK.

References

Research institutes in the Czech Republic
Research institutes established in 2011
2011 establishments in the Czech Republic